Guilding may refer to:

 Reverend Lansdown Guilding (1797-1831), malacologist from St. Vincent
 Gilding, the technique of applying a thin layer of gold to a surface.